Peter Crane (born December 22, 1948, in London, England) is a British film director, film producer and television director.

He directed the feature films Assassin (1973) and Moments (1974). He also directed episodes of the American television series B. J. and the Bear, Darkroom, The Fall Guy, Knight Rider, Masquerade. Moonlighting, Murder, She Wrote, Guns of Paradise, Hunter and Kung Fu: The Legend Continues, his last directing credit.

He also produced numerous films including The Passion of Ayn Rand (1999), in which he was nominated for the Television Producer of the Year Award in Longform at the 2000 Producers Guild of America Awards.

References

External links

1948 births
Living people
British expatriates in the United States
British film producers
British television directors
Film directors from London